Ballari or Bellary may refer to–
 Bellary, a historic city in Bellary District in Karnataka state
 Bellary district, a district in Karnataka state
 Ballari language, a language of India